"Nobody's Perfect" is a song by American rapper and record producer J. Cole, released as the fifth and final single from his debut studio album Cole World: The Sideline Story. The song, featuring singer-songwriter and fellow rapper Missy Elliott, was produced by Cole himself and interpolates "Think" as performed by Curtis Mayfield. The song was serviced to urban radio on February 7, 2012 through Roc Nation and Columbia.

Background 
On October 24, 2011, J. Cole confirmed his next single would be "Nobody's Perfect" featuring Missy Elliott. Prior to its official radio and digital release, the song debuted on the Billboard Hot R&B/Hip-Hop Songs chart at number eighty-seven. The song officially impacted urban radio on February 7, 2012.

Music video 
The music video was filmed in February 2012 by director Colin Tilley. It premiered on 106 & Park on March 14, 2012.

Chart performance
The song first charted on the week of February 6, 2012, on the Hot R&B/Hip-Hop Songs chart at number eighty-seven. It has since peaked at number three. The song debuted on the Billboard Hot 100 on the week of May 28, 2012, entering the chart at number ninety.

Charts

Weekly charts

Year-end charts

Certifications

Radio add dates and release history

References

2011 songs
2012 singles
Roc Nation singles
J. Cole songs
Songs written by J. Cole
Song recordings produced by J. Cole
Missy Elliott songs
Songs written by Curtis Mayfield
Music videos directed by Colin Tilley